Afrotheora flavimaculata is a species of moth of the family Hepialidae. It is known from Angola.

References

External links
Hepialidae genera

Endemic fauna of Angola
Moths described in 1986
Hepialidae
Insects of Angola
Moths of Africa